Ted Stevens (born July 4, 1975) is an American rock musician from Omaha, Nebraska, best known as the guitarist and backup singer for the band Cursive, as well as fronting Mayday. He previously fronted the indie folk band Lullaby for the Working Class.

Release history

With Lullaby for the Working Class
Blanket Warm (1996 · Bar/None Records)
I Never Even Asked for Light (1997 · Bar/None Records)
Song (1999 · Bar/None Records)

With Cursive
Domestica (2000, Saddle Creek Records)
Burst and Bloom (2001, Saddle Creek Records)
8 Teeth to Eat You (2002, Better Looking Records)
The Ugly Organ (2003, Saddle Creek Records)
Happy Hollow (2006, Saddle Creek Records)
Mama, I'm Swollen (2009, Saddle Creek Records)
I Am Gemini (2012, Saddle Creek Records)

With Mayday
Old Blood (2002 · Saddle Creek Records)
I Know Your Troubles Been Long (2003 · Bar/None Records [cd], Greyday Records [lp])
Bushido Karaoke (2005 · Saddle Creek Records)

Other
Bright Eyes - A Collection of Songs Written and Recorded 1995-1997 (1998 - Saddle Creek)
Bright Eyes - Letting off the Happiness (1998 · Saddle Creek records)
Bright Eyes - Lifted or The Story is in the Soil, Keep Your Ear to the Ground (2002 · Saddle Creek Records)
Bright Eyes - Cassadaga (2007 · Saddle Creek Records)
McCarthy Trenching - McCarthy Trenching (2007 - Team Love Records)

External links
Official Cursive website
Mayday album website
Saddle Creek Records

American agnostics
American rock guitarists
American male guitarists
American rock singers
American indie rock musicians
Musicians from Omaha, Nebraska
1975 births
Living people
Cursive (band) members
Place of birth missing (living people)
Lullaby for the Working Class members
21st-century American singers